Hari Roka is a Nepalese politician. At the age of 13, he was sentenced to seven years imprisonment for having taken part in a demonstration and took HSC at 13.

He has studied at Ph.D-level (yet to be completed) at Jawaharlal Nehru University, India. In 2007 he was nominated to the interim parliament. In July 2008 he became a nominated member of the Constituent Assembly on behalf of Communist Party of Nepal (Maoist).

References

Jawaharlal Nehru University alumni
Living people
Communist Party of Nepal (Maoist Centre) politicians
Nepalese atheists
Year of birth missing (living people)
Members of the 1st Nepalese Constituent Assembly